= Boligbygg Oslo KF =

Norwegian housing corporation

Boligbygg Oslo KF is a Norwegian municipal corporation for housing. The corporation owns, operates, and manages all rental housing units owned by the Oslo municipality. Boligbygg Oslo KF provides housing to approximately 25,000 residents in more than 10,800 rental units in 15 different city districts.

The Oslo city district administration offices receives applications for municipal flats, and also decides who will be granted a flat. Boligbygg Oslo KF informs the city district administration about vacant housing, and signs leases with people who have been assigned a flat.
